The Turmodigi were a pre-Roman ancient people, later mixed with the Celts people of northern Spain who occupied the area within the Arlanzón and Arlanza river valleys in the 2nd Iron Age.

Origins 
The ancestors of the Turmodigi arrived to the Iberian Peninsula in the wake of the earlier Autrigones-Belgae migration at the 4th Century BC, which settled in the area between the Arlanzón and Arlanza rivers. The neighbouring tribes surrounding the Turmodigi are mentioned by classic sources as being Celtic, as attested by the personal name 'Tormogus' in some local epigraphic sources. 
Designated Turmodigi by the Roman geographer Pliny the Elder, they are also mentioned in other Roman texts under the names Turmogi or Curgoni, and in the Greek ones as Murbogoioi or Mourbogoi (Ancient Greek: Μούρβογοι).

Culture 

Archeology has related them with the early Iron Age ‘Bernorio-Miraveche’ cultural group of northern Burgos and Palencia provinces. Moreover, recent studies carried out at their most famed cemetery of Miraveche and as well as other 2nd Iron Age sites in the region indicates that their culture was heavily celtiberianized, demonstrating also strong affinities with the ‘Duero Culture’ of the Vaccei. In the 2nd Century BC they established a state with Segisama, also named Segisamone or Segisamum (Sasamón – Burgos; Celtiberian mint: Sekisamos) as its capital, along with the towns of Sisaraca/Pisoraca (Herrera de Pisuerga – Palencia), Deobrigula/Teobrigula (Tardajos – Burgos), Ambisna (Pampliega?– Burgos), Bravum/Bravon (Huermeces, Ubierna or La Nuez de Abajo, in the Santibañez valley – Burgos), and Mancellus (near Lerma, in the Arlanza river valley). The attribution of Pisoraca to the Turmodigi is under discussion, being attributed to the Cantabri peoples in the latest studies.

History 

Initially a client tribe of the Autrigones, the Turmodigi threw off their yoke with the help of the Vaccei around the early 3rd Century BC, seizing most of the former's lands corresponding today to the central and western Burgos province and the eastern Palencia province.  Like their Autrigones' and Vaccei neighbours, the Turmodigi retained a separated identity until the later 1st Century BC, when they were first conquered and included in Hispania Citerior by Pompey and Quintus Caecilius Metellus Pius in 73 BC.  However, the Turmodigi were not subdued until 56 BC, after a joint uprising with the Vaccei and other peoples was defeated by the Proconsul of Citerior Quintus Caecilius Metellus Nepos Iunior. Subjected to Cantabri and Astures' raids, they allied themselves with Rome during the Astur-Cantabrian wars in the late 1st century BC, even allowing Emperor Augustus' to establish its own headquarters at their capital Segisama and turned Turmodigia into a rear base for the conquest of both Asturias and Cantabria.

See also 
Cantabrian Wars
Sertorian Wars
Pre-Roman peoples of the Iberian Peninsula

Notes

References

 Ángel Montenegro et alii, Historia de España 2 - colonizaciones y formación de los pueblos prerromanos (1200-218 a.C), Editorial Gredos, Madrid (1989) 
 Francisco Burillo Mozota, Los Celtíberos, etnias y estados, Crítica, Grijalbo Mondadori, S.A., Barcelona (1998, revised edition 2007)

External links
http://www.celtiberia.net
http://www.montebernorio.com

Pre-Roman peoples of the Iberian Peninsula
Celtic tribes of the Iberian Peninsula
Ancient peoples of Spain